Murat Khabachirov (born 14 May 1988) is a Russian judoka.

He is the bronze medallist of the 2017 Judo Grand Prix Antalya in the -81 kg category.

References

External links
 

1988 births
Living people
Russian male judoka
21st-century Russian people